Pseudo-Orpheus is the name of a poetic text, preserved only in quotations by various Christian writers, which has a complex history. Pseudo-Orpheus appears in multiple recensions (versions created over time). The poem presents the legendary Greek figure Orpheus as giving a poetic speech to his son, Musaeus, identified as the biblical Moses, passing on to him hidden wisdom he learned in Egypt. It presents a monotheistic view of God, whom, according to the poem, no one has seen, except for Abraham, who was able to see God due to his skill at astrology.

Although preserved in Christian writers, most scholars believe that it is "of Jewish authorship." Over time, a number of Christian and Jewish authors reworked Greek traditions about Orpheus and used them to support their monotheistic views and to assert the religious supremacy of Moses and monotheism over Greek polytheistic views. The rhetorical device of using legendary non-monotheistic figures to endorse Judaism is likewise found in the Sibylline Oracles.

"Pseudo-Orpheus" is also sometimes applied to the unknown writer of other works falsely attributed to Orpheus.

Preserved versions

The following are the primary forms of Pseudo-Orpheus that have survived to the present. The exact dating of the various recensions is disputed.

The first extant writer who quotes the work is Clement of Alexandria, who lived about 150-215 AD. Clement provides "numerous short quotations" from Pseudo-Orpheus; one (abbreviated C2) matching the edition of Eusebius, and the rest, collectively known as C1, mostly but not exclusively in agreement with the version of the poem known as J (see below).

The recension which appears in Eusebius (abbreviated E) seems to have been produced in the second or first century BC. Eusebius claims to have taken the poem from the writings of Aristobulus of Alexandria, a Hellenistic Jewish philosopher who lived in the second century BC. This version is known as the Mosaic recension because of its focus on Moses. This version is variously counted at either forty one or forty-six lines of hexameter verse.

A shorter recension appears in the works of an author referred to as Pseudo-Justin (approximately or at some unknown point before 300 AD) who is so called because his original name is not known, although he was for a time confused with the second-century writer Justin Martyr. This version contains 21 lines and is referred to as J.

Another recension, known as T, or the "Theosophical" recension, contains all the lines found in the other versions of the poem, and mostly agrees with E. This version is found in the Tübingen Theosophy or Theosophy of Tübingen, "an epitome of a late-fifth century collection of oracles".

External links

The recension in Eusebius (E) can be found in Book XIII of Eusebius' Praeparatio Evangelica (Preparation for the Gospel), as translated in 1903 by E. H. Gifford. Within the HTML file, Pseudo-Orpheus is found in chapter 12, and consists of the first indented section of the chapter, from the words "I speak to those who lawfully may hear" to the words "store this doctrine in thine heart."

The recension in Pseudo-Justin (J) can be found chapter 2 of Pseudo-Justin's De Monarchia in the poetic section which begins with the words, "I'll speak to those who lawfully may hear" and ending with the words, "The depths, too, of the blue and hoary sea." The translation is by G. Reith, as found in volume I of The Anti-Nicene Fathers, edited by Alexander Roberts and James Donaldson in 1885.

References

Christianity and Hellenistic religion
Hellenistic Judaism